William Adams ( – ) was an American theologian and educator, co-founder of Nashotah House.

William Adams was born on  Monaghan, Ireland. He graduated from Trinity College with a Bachelor of Arts in 1838. He read law and medicine each for a year, and was for a time with his uncle at Ballyhaise as an accountant. He immigrated to New York City in 1839 and he entered the General Theological Seminary of the Protestant Episcopal church, graduating in 1841. He was ordained a deacon on July 1841, and a priest October 9, 1843.

He was one of the founders of Nashotah mission, afterward Nashotah theological seminary, in Wisconsin, where he went in September 1841. During the following winter he contributed to an English publication an article on the church's duties to her emigrants, which attracted much attention. He was rector at Delafield and Pine Lake from 1878 to 1886, and from the foundation of the Nashotah seminary he was the professor of systematic divinity until his death.

Dr. Adams published Mercy to Babes (New York, 1847), Christian Science (Philadelphia, 1850), and A New Treatise on Baptismal Regeneration (New York, 1871), and contributed largely to periodical literature, writing principally on theological topics.

William Adams died on 2 January 1897 in Nashotah.

References 

Created via preloaddraft
1813 births
1897 deaths
Nashotah House faculty
People from County Monaghan